Louis Otto Wendenburg (January 21, 1861 – July 17, 1934) was an American lawyer and Democratic politician who served as a member of the Virginia Senate, representing the state's 35th district.

Wendenburg is buried at Hollywood Cemetery, Section C, Lot 25, Richmond, Virginia.

References

External links
 
 

1861 births
1934 deaths
University of Virginia School of Law alumni
Democratic Party Virginia state senators
Politicians from Richmond, Virginia
20th-century American politicians
Burials at Hollywood Cemetery (Richmond, Virginia)
Lawyers from Richmond, Virginia